Hannah Island is an island of the Nares Strait, Greenland.  Administratively it belongs to the Avannaata municipality. 

Hannah Island was named after Hannah (Tookoolito), an Inuit guide who accompanied Charles Francis Hall in the 1871 Polaris expedition.

Geography
Hannah Island lies in the mouth of Bessel Fjord and northeast of Cape Bryan by the Kennedy Channel. The waters around the island are frozen most of the year.

The island consists of a huge mound of pebbles and drift, probably the deposit of an ancient glacier. It has an area of 0.5 km2 and an elevation of 36 meters. Lichens and lichenicolous fungi grow on the island.

See also
List of islands of Greenland
List of features in Greenland named after Greenlandic Inuit

Bibliography
Edward L. Moss, Shores of the polar sea

References

Uninhabited islands of Greenland